Levski-Rakovski is a Bulgarian association football club based in Sofia, which competes in the Third League, the third division of the Bulgarian football league system. Levski-Rakovskis home ground is the Rakovski Stadium in Sofia, which has a capacity of 5,000 spectators.

History
Levski-Rakovski began its history as a supporting youth academy for Levski Sofia. In 2017 Stanislav Angelov was announced as the new director of the academy.

2017–present: Stanislav Angelov takeover
In August 2017, Krasimir Ivanov, CEO of Levski Sofia, announced that Levski-Rakovski Academy is no longer part of Levski. In an open letter from parents of kids that train in the academy, it was announced that Levski-Rakovski will start as an individual team, since there was no support from Levski Sofia management. For the 2019-20 season the team joined Bulgarian A Regional Group. In 2021 the reconstruction of Rakovski Stadium was finished with Hristo Stoichkov being at the opening.

The team won its promotion to Third League in 2022. In July 2022 Angelov announced that a second team will be introduced with Levski-Rakovski II joining the A RFG Sofia with Radi Georgiev becoming the manager, while Angelov becomes head coach of the first team.

Players

Current squad

Out on loan

Honours

A RFG Sofa Capital South:
  Winners (2): 2020-21, 2021–22

Personnel

Managerial history

Current technical body

Past seasons

References

External links
Official website
bgclubs.eu

Levski-Rakovski Sofia
Association football clubs established in 2017
2017 establishments in Bulgaria